Dagmar Käsling (later Lühnenschloß, born 15 February 1947 in Magdeburg) is a former East German athlete who competed mainly in the 400 metres.

She competed for East Germany in the 1972 Summer Olympics held in Munich, Germany in the 4 × 400 metres where she won the gold medal with her team mates Rita Kühne, Helga Seidler and Monika Zehrt.

Käsling married sprinter Gerhard Lühnenschloß.  Then she became Prof. Dr. Lühnenschloß, a lecturer at the Institut für Sportwissenschaften of the Otto-von-Guericke-Universität in Magdeburg, teaching and researching track & field training science.  In 2005, she published the book "Schnelligkeit."

References

External links
 

1947 births
Living people
East German female sprinters
Athletes (track and field) at the 1972 Summer Olympics
Olympic athletes of East Germany
Olympic gold medalists for East Germany
Recipients of the Patriotic Order of Merit in silver
Sportspeople from Magdeburg
Medalists at the 1972 Summer Olympics
Olympic gold medalists in athletics (track and field)
Olympic female sprinters